Jean-Claude Skrela (born 1 October 1949 in Colomiers, Haute-Garonne) is a former coach of the French national rugby union team. His son, David Skrela, is a French rugby union player and his daughter, Gaëlle Skrela, is a professional basketball player.

Early life 
Skrela was born in Colomiers near Toulouse in France. His parents were Polish refugees (his father came from the village Kobiela, his mother from the village Charbinowice). He lost his father when he was 12.

Playing career 
He won forty-six caps and won the Five Nations Championship in 1973 (tie victory) and in 1977 (Grand Slam). He also scored the first four-point try in a major Test match on 20 November 1971, when he charged down a kick from Australian fullback Arthur McGill.

Coaching 
In 1983, he joined his team-mate Pierre Villepreux as coach of Stade Toulousain. They won three times the home championship, twice against Toulon (in 1985 and in 1989) and against Agen in 1986.

He was appointed director of rugby at Colomiers in 1994 but left his position to replace Pierre Berbizier as French head coach after the 1995 Rugby World Cup.

He became the first European head coach to win on his first attempt against , but he failed to win against  and  like his predecessor Pierre Berbizier. France suffered a few defeats against lowest level teams, like  in 1999 or like  in 1997 (Italy was making a lot of progress at this stage), but was also able to make great come backs, like against  in 1997 or against  in their World Cup semi final at Twickenham. He also made a back-to-back Grand Slam in 1997 and 1998. He suffered a lack of results in 1999 before the World Cup.

After Jacques Fouroux, he became the second head coach to lead France to the World Cup Final, but lost to Australia. He resigned as French head coach on 16 November 1999.

International matches as Head coach

Record by country

Honours 
 Five Nations Championship
 Winner 1997, 1998
 Rugby World Cup
 Runner-up 1999
 Latin Cup
 Winner 1995, 1997
 Trophée des Bicentenaires
 Runner-up 1997, 1998

Other honours

As a player 
France
 Five Nations Championship
 Winner 1973, 1977
 Runner-up 1976, 1978

Stade toulousain
 France Rugby Union Championship
 Runner-up 1980
 Challenge Yves du Manoir
 Runner-up 1971

As a coach 
Stade toulousain
 France Rugby Union Championship
 Winner 1985, 1986, 1989
 Runner-up 1991
 Challenge Yves du Manoir
 Winner 1988
 Runner-up 1984

References

External links
 ESPN Scrum Profile

1949 births
Living people
French people of Polish descent
French rugby union players
French rugby union coaches
Barbarian F.C. players
Stade Toulousain players
France international rugby union players
Stade Toulousain coaches
France national rugby union team coaches
Rugby union flankers
Sportspeople from Haute-Garonne